The Canon de 152 mm Modèle 1930 was a medium-caliber naval gun used as the primary armament on a number of French cruisers and as dual-purpose secondary armament on Richelieu-class battleships during World War II.

Description
The Canon de 152 mm Modèle 1930 was built with an autofretted jacket, a breech ring and a vertical sliding breech block.  Useful life expectancy was 700 effective full charges (EFC) per barrel.  These guns were carried in triple turrets aboard both cruisers and battleships.  The triple turrets were slightly unusual in that each gun had its own cradle and they could be elevated or depressed independently.  The triple turrets on cruisers were considered successful, but the dual-purpose triple turrets for battleships were problematic and of the five turrets that were planned for the Richelieu-class only three were mounted.  The triple mountings in the Richelieu-class were intended to elevate -10° to +90°, but were later limited to +85°.  It was also planned that they could be loaded at any angle, but this was found to be impractical beyond +45°.  The mountings slow train and elevation rates meant that they could not track fast-moving aircraft, combined with their slow rate of fire limited their usefulness in an anti-aircraft role.

Ammunition
Ammunition was of separate loading QF type with powder charge, case and a projectile.

The gun was able to fire: 
 Semi Armour-Piercing - 
 High Explosive - 
 Illumination -

Naval Service

Ship classes that carried the Canon de 152 mm Modèle 1930 include:
 Cruiser Émile Bertin
 La Galissonnière-class cruisers
 Richelieu-class battleships

Notes

References

External links 
 http://www.navweaps.com/Weapons/WNFR_6-55_m1930.php

Naval guns of France
152 mm artillery